Dasharathchand is a municipality and the district headquarter of Baitadi District in Sudurpashchim Province of Nepal. It is a hill station above Mahakali River close to the Indian border. At the time of the 2011 Nepal census it had a population of 34,575 people living in 7,257 individual households.

Background
Dasharatchand municipality was established in 1997 at the time, when the government of Nepal established a total of 22 Municipalities. 
Six VDCs were merged while establishing this municipality. Those VDCs were: Dashrathchanda, Khalanga, Tripurasundari, Thalegada, Jogannath and Barakot. It was divided into 13 wards.

In March 2017, the Government of Nepal restructured all the local level bodies of Nepal into 753 new local level structures. The previous Gurukhola, Dehimandau, Durga Bhabani, portion of Durgasthan, Gwallek and Nagarjun VDCs merged to the former Dashrathchanda Municipality and rearranged it into 11 wards.

Media 
To promote local culture, Dasharathchanda has two FM radio stations Saugat F.M. (103.6 MHz) and Radio Sunsher (106.6 MHz). There is also Radio Nwedeu, a community radio station.

Transportation 
Mahakali Highway links Dasharathchand to Dhangadhi in the South and Api Municipality in the North.

References

Populated places in Baitadi District
Municipalities in Baitadi District
Nepal municipalities established in 1997